Philipsburg Historic District is a national historic district located at Philipsburg, Centre County, Pennsylvania.  The district includes 228 contributing buildings and 2 contributing sites in the central business district and surrounding residential areas of Philipsburg. The oldest house is the John Henry Simler House (1807). Notable non-residential buildings include the Town Hall (1887), U.S. Post Office (1935), Union Church (1820-1840), St. Paul's Episcopal Church (1911), First Presbyterian Church (1908), and New Life Center Church (1893).  The contributing sites are two small parks at the center of Philipsburg.  Also located in the district are the separately listed Hardman Philips House, Rowland Theater, and Union Church and Burial Ground.

It was added to the National Register of Historic Places in 1999.

References

Historic districts on the National Register of Historic Places in Pennsylvania
Greek Revival architecture in Pennsylvania
Queen Anne architecture in Pennsylvania
Historic districts in Centre County, Pennsylvania
National Register of Historic Places in Centre County, Pennsylvania